Dennis Brown (born January 10, 1956) is an American retired professional wrestler, better known by his ring name, "Downtown" Denny Brown. He is best known for his appearances with the National Wrestling Alliance affiliates Championship Wrestling from Florida and Jim Crockett Promotions in the 1980s and with World Championship Wrestling in the 1990s.

Early life 
After serving in the United States Army, Brown attended welding school in St. Petersburg, Florida. After completing his training, he moved to Knoxville, Tennessee in search of work, but was rejected by the trade union due to not coming from Tennessee. His uncle introduced him to professional wrestler Rick Conners, who agreed to train him.

Professional wrestling career 
Brown debuted in 1979. In 1980, he began wrestling for Jim Crockett Promotions as "Downtown" Denny Brown. After wrestling as a jobber for several years, Brown won the NWA World Junior Heavyweight Championship at Starrcade in 1984 from Mike Davis. When New Japan Pro-Wrestling (NJPW) withdrew their separate claim to the title, Brown was recognized as the undisputed champion in August 1985. He held the title three times over the following months, feuding with Nelson Royal, Gary Royal, Steve Regal and Lazer Tron.

Later in his career, Brown wrestled in Florida Championship Wrestling (FCW) and as a jobber in World Championship Wrestling (WCW) before retiring in 1997.

Championships and accomplishments 
Championship Wrestling from Florida
NWA Florida Junior Heavyweight Championship (1 time)
Georgia Championship Wrestling
NWA World Junior Heavyweight Championship (1 time)
International Wrestling Association of Japan
IWA World Junior Heavyweight Championship (1 time)
Jim Crockett Promotions
NWA World Junior Heavyweight Championship (1 time)
National Wrestling Alliance1
NWA World Junior Heavyweight Championship (3 times)
South Atlantic Pro Wrestling
SAPW Junior Heavyweight Championship (1 time)

1NWA records are unclear as to where Brown was or what NWA affiliated promotion he was wrestling for when his first reign with the championship began.

References

External links

1956 births
Living people
American male professional wrestlers
People from St. Petersburg, Florida
Professional wrestlers from Florida
United States Army soldiers
Welders
20th-century professional wrestlers
NWA World Junior Heavyweight Champions